A lichenicolous fungus is a parasitic fungus that only lives on lichen as the host. A lichenicolous fungus is not the same as the fungus that is the component of the lichen, which is known as a lichenized fungus. They are most commonly specific to a given fungus as the host, but they also include a wide range of pathogens, saprotrophs, and commensals. It is estimated there are 3000 species of lichenicolous fungi. More than 1800 species are already described among the Ascomycota and Basidiomycota. More than 95% of lichenicolous fungi described as of 2003 are ascomycetes, in 7 classes and 19 orders. Although basidiomycetes have less than 5% of lichenicolous lichen species, they represent 4 classes and 8 orders. Many lichenicolous species have yet to be assigned a phylogenetic position as of 2003.

See also 
 List of lichenicolous fungi of Iceland

References

Lichenology
Lichenicolous fungi